Beaver is a city in, and county seat of, Beaver County in southwestern Utah, United States. The population was 3,592 at the 2020 census, up from the 2010 figure of 3,112.

History

Indigenous peoples lived in this area for thousands of years, as shown by archeological evidence. A number of identified prehistoric sites have been found in Beaver County, dating to the Archaic and Sevier Fremont periods. A prehistoric obsidian quarry site has been identified in the nearby Mineral Mountains.

The historic Southern Paiute inhabited the region well before encountering the first European explorers. The 1776 Dominguez–Escalante Expedition is the first known European exploration in this area. 

In 1847–1848, Mormons from the United States developed a trade route through the Beaver River valley between their new settlements at Salt Lake City in the Utah Territory and Los Angeles, which was still part of Alta California, Mexico. The original route crossed the river three miles downstream from Beaver at the site that later was developed as Greenville. This route became known during the California Gold Rush as the Southern Route of the California Trail. Later called the Mormon Road or California Road, it passed over the Black Mountains between the crossing and Muley Point. Following the United States' victory in the Mexican–American War (1846–1848), it took over California and the Southwest.

In 1855, as part of improvements, the Mormon Road over the Black Mountains was realigned eastward. It was routed from the site that developed as Beaver to Muley Point through more wagon-friendly terrain in Nevershine Hollow and over Beaver Ridge into the canyon of Fremont Wash, rejoining the original road above Muley Point.  This road became a winter commercial wagon road, known in California as the Los Angeles – Salt Lake Road, and in Mormon settlements in Utah and Arizona Territory (now southern Nevada) as the California Road.

Beaver was settled in 1856 by Mormon pioneers traveling this road; it was one of a string of Mormon settlements along the road through Utah. By design, these settlements were located a day's ride on horseback apart, which explains the regularity of their spacing. Beaver was developed between the settlements in the Pahvant Valley and those in the Parowan Valley.

In 1873 the US Army established Fort Cameron, two miles from Beaver, because of Indian raids on the area Mormon settlements. To serve this isolated area, the territorial government placed the Second Judicial Court of the Utah Territory in Beaver from 1870 until 1896, when Utah became a state. Also included in this court's jurisdiction were Iron, Washington, Kane, Garfield, and Piute counties. 

In 1856, Mormons migrated to the Beaver Valley from Parowan to the south. George A. Smith called a council meeting in February 1856, and the men elected Simeon F. Howd as presiding elder and Edward W. Thompson, clerk. In 1858, numerous migrants from San Bernardino, California, settled here.  In December 1859, W. W. Willis and P. K. Smith were authorized by the council to build a sawmill and gristmill on North Creek, and given control of all water on the mill site. By 1869, the Mormon settlers in Beaver were numerous enough to organize a stake. The first stake president was John Murdock.

During the 1870s, settlers made an effort to establish a woolen mill, a tannery, and a dairy industry.  Most were engaged in stock raising.

Beaver was the first town in Utah to be electrified. A hydroelectric generation plant was constructed on the Beaver River early in the 20th century. The plant continues to provide a large part of Beaver's power requirements today. Although, contrary to popular belief, it is not locally referred to as "Beaver Dam!" 

In 2006, Beaver won a contest for best tasting rural water in the United States. In 2010, Beaver took top honors in the world for best tasting water. Its welcome billboards along I-15 highlight the water quality.

Geography
Beaver is located in eastern Beaver County, along Interstate 15, the main artery for the state. To the east of Beaver lie the Tushar Mountains. The Beaver River flows out of the mountains and through the city of Beaver, passing south of downtown before continuing west towards Minersville and the Escalante Desert basin. The Mineral Mountains rise to the west of Beaver, and the South Hills are to the south.

Interstate 15 runs along the western edge of Beaver, with access from exits 109 and 112. Utah State Route 153 heads east from Beaver across the Tushar Mountains  to Junction, and Utah State Route 21 runs west through the Beaver River Valley  to Minersville.

The American Discovery Trail runs through Beaver.

An important Beaver landmark is the hillside letter B, which is visible from the freeway.

Climate
Beaver has a typical Intermountain Region cool semi-arid climate (Köppen BSk), bordering on a humid continental climate (Dfb), with summers characterized by hot days and chilly nights, and cold winters with moderate snowfall.

During the summer, days are hot and usually dry, though on occasions, as in July 1936 – the wettest month on record with  – monsoonal weather can bring heavy thunderstorms from the Gulf of California. Owing to the absence of cloudiness caused by the Great Salt Lake, nights are much cooler than in Salt Lake City or Ogden during this season.

Winters are cold, though not severe, and generally dry, with the city's intermountain valley location making it sufficiently dry that only  of snowfall can be expected each winter. Typically temperatures fall below freezing on all but six nights during winter and on 193.7 nights during an entire year; however maxima will top freezing on all but 14.3 afternoons.

Government

Local Government 
Beaver uses a city council with five council members and a mayor. The city also has a city manager who runs day-to-day business affairs. 

The current city mayor, council members, and city manager are:
 Mayor: Matt Robinson 
 Council Members: Lance Cox, Tyler Schena, Alison Webb, Hal Murdock, Robin Bradshaw
 City manager: Jason Brown.

Demographics

As of 2010, the total population of Beaver was 3,112, which is 26.81% more than it was in 2000. The population growth rate is higher than the state average rate of 23.77% and is much higher than the national average rate of 9.71%. The Beaver population density is 479.56 people per square mile, which is much higher than the state average density of 32.56 people per square mile and is much higher than the national average density of 81.32 people per square mile. The most prevalent race in Beaver is white, which represent 88.37% of the total population. The average Beaver education level is lower than the state average and is lower than the national average.

As of the census of 2000, 2,454 people, 856 households, and 653 families resided in the city. The population density was 535.5 people per square mile (206.9/km). The 1,021 housing units  averaged  222.8 per square mile (86.1/km). The racial makeup of the city was 94.74% White, 0.53% Native American, 0.16% Asian, 3.06% from other races, and 1.51% from two or more races. Hispanics or Latinos of any race were 5.05% of the population.

Of the 856 households, 41.0% had children under the age of 18 living with them, 65.0% were married couples living together, 7.9% had a female householder with no husband present, and 23.6% were not families. About 21.4% of all households were made up of individuals, and 10.6% had someone living alone who was 65 years of age or older. The average household size was 2.84, and the average family size was 3.33.

In the city, the age distribution of the population shows 32.9% under the age of 18, 9.0% from 18 to 24, 23.3% from 25 to 44, 19.7% from 45 to 64, and 15.0% who were 65 years of age or older. The median age was 32 years. For every 100 females, there were 93.5 males. For every 100 females age 18 and over, there were 92.5 males.

The median income for a household in the city was $33,646, and for a family was $37,933. Males had a median income of $29,485 versus $17,159 for females. The per capita income for the city was $14,412. About 6.7% of families and 8.6% of the population were below the poverty line, including 9.0% of those under age 18 and 6.4% of those age 65 or over.

Notable people

 Butch Cassidy, born in Beaver, became a notorious outlaw in the American West.
 Betty Compson, was born in Beaver March 3, 1897. She was an early motion picture star of such films as The Pony Express (1925).
 Philo Farnsworth, inventor of several critical electronic devices that made television possible and of the Farnsworth–Hirsch fusor, a small nuclear fusion device.
 Ida Hunt Udall, born March 8, 1858, in Iron County, spent most of her childhood and adolescence in Beaver. In adulthood she became a diarist and homesteader.

See also

 List of cities and towns in Utah

References

External links

 

Cities in Beaver County, Utah
Cities in Utah
County seats in Utah
Populated places established in 1856
Mormon Road